Yuan-Shih Chow (Pinyin: Zhōu Yuánshēn; 1 September 1924 – 3 March 2022), also known as Y. S. Chow or Zhou Yuanshen, was a Chinese and American probabilist. He was Professor Emeritus, Columbia University, United States.

Chow served as director-general of the Institute of Mathematics, Academia Sinica, and director of the Center of Applied Statistics, Nankai University (Tianjin). He was an academician of the Academia Sinica.

Life
Chow was born in Zhouwan Village, Zhangnan County, Xiangfan, Hubei Province, China. He entered the (National) Hechuan No.2 Meddile School. But because of the Japanese invasion, he left his hometown and finished his high school education in Chongqing - the capital of China during the Second Sino-Japanese War. He became a student of the Department of Mathematics, National Chekiang University (Zhejiang University) and he was a student of Su Buqing. About 1949, he went to Taiwan and taught Mathematics at the National Taiwan University in Taipei.

In July 1954, following the advice of Chung Tao Yang, Chow went to USA. He entered the University of Illinois and studied under the guidance of Joseph Leo Doob. In 1958, he received his PhD. He became a staff member at the IBM Watson Research Laboratory, later at Columbia University till 1962. 1962–1968, he served in the Statistics Department, Purdue University. 1968–1993, he was the Professor of Mathematical Statistics, Columbia University. He was also a visiting professor at different universities including the University of California at Berkeley, the National Central University in Taiwan, the University of Heidelberg in Germany. He was Professor Emeritus, Columbia University.

Chow died in Hubei province on 3 March 2022, at the age of 97.

Membership
 Fellow, Institute of Mathematical Statistics (1966 election) 
 Fellow, International Statistical Institute (1980 election)
 Academician, Academia Sinica (1974 election)

Books by him
 Probability Theory: Independence, Interchangeability, Martingales, (with Henry Teicher), Springer Verlag,  
 The Theory of Optimal Stopping, with Herbert Robbins and David Siegmund, 1971

References

External links
 A Conversation with Yuan Shih Chow, abstract (English)
 A Conversation with Yuan Shih Chow pdf version, full biography including photos, by Zhiliang Ying and Cun-Hui Zhang(English)
 Archive at Harvard University (English)
 Chow's biography from the website of East China Normal University(Chinese)
 Chow's résumé (Chinese)

1924 births
2022 deaths
20th-century Chinese  mathematicians
21st-century Chinese  mathematicians
Chinese expatriates in the United States
Zhejiang University alumni
American statisticians
Fellows of the Institute of Mathematical Statistics
Elected Members of the International Statistical Institute
Chinese statisticians
Academic staff of Nankai University
Columbia University faculty
Educators from Hubei
People from Xiangyang
Academic staff of the National Taiwan University
Mathematicians from Hubei